"Give It Up" is a single released by Irish rock group Hothouse Flowers from their second album Home. The song hit number two on the U.S. Modern Rock chart and number 30 on the UK Singles Chart.

Charts

References

1990 singles
1990 songs
Hothouse Flowers songs